Waterloo Community School District (WCSD) is a public school district headquartered in Waterloo, Iowa.

It is entirely in Black Hawk County. In addition to almost all of Waterloo the municipalities of Elk Run Heights, Evansdale, Gilbertville, and Raymond are in the district limits, as well as the census-designated place of Washburn. It also covers a portion of Cedar Falls.

There was originally a single school district in Waterloo, but in 1866 the district split in two, with a Waterloo and an East Waterloo district, until 1942, when they merged into the Independent School District of Waterloo.

History

In 2015 the district drew up plans for a school bond with a value of $47 million.

Schools

High:
 Waterloo East High School
 Waterloo West High School
 Expo Alternative Learning Center

Middle:
 Bunger Middle School (Evansdale)
 Central Middle School
 George Washington Carver Academy
 Hoover Middle School

Elementary:
 Fred Becker Elementary School
 Dr. Walter Cunningham School for Excellence
 Lou Henry Elementary School
 Highland Elementary School
 Irving Elementary School
 Kingsley Elementary School
 Kittrell Elementary School
 Lincoln Elementary School
 Lowell Elementary School
 Orange Elementary School
 Poyner Elementary School (Evansdale) - Located on the site of the former St. Nicholas Catholic Church.

Preschool:
 Early Childhood School (Elk Run Heights)

Enrollment

References

External links
 Waterloo Community School District

See also
List of school districts in Iowa

School districts in Iowa
Education in Black Hawk County, Iowa
Waterloo, Iowa
Cedar Falls, Iowa
School districts established in 1942
1942 establishments in Iowa